Arthur Hannemann (born 23 October 1935) is a German former middle-distance runner. He competed in the men's 1500 metres at the 1960 Summer Olympics.

References

External links
 

1935 births
Living people
Athletes (track and field) at the 1960 Summer Olympics
Athletes (track and field) at the 1964 Summer Olympics
German male middle-distance runners
German male long-distance runners
Olympic athletes of the United Team of Germany
Place of birth missing (living people)
20th-century German people
21st-century German people